Cosmin Sabin Goia (born 16 February 1982) is a Romanian football defender and manager who plays and manages for Liga IV – Timiș County club Progresul Ciacova. Goia played in Romania for teams like: Politehnica Timișoara, CFR Cluj, Brașov and Unirea Alba Iulia, in Hungary for Nyíregyháza Spartacus and Pécs and in Vietnam for SHB-Đà Nẵng, Sanna Khánh Hòa and Hoàng Anh Gia Lai.

References

External sources
 Sabin-Cosmin Goia at HLSZ.hu 
 
 
 

1982 births
Living people
Sportspeople from Timișoara
Romanian footballers
Association football defenders
Liga I players
Liga II players
FC Politehnica Timișoara players
CSM Câmpia Turzii players
CFR Cluj players
FC Brașov (1936) players
CSM Unirea Alba Iulia players
CSM Deva players
Nemzeti Bajnokság I players
Nyíregyháza Spartacus FC players
Pécsi MFC players
V.League 1 players
SHB Da Nang FC players
Romanian expatriate footballers
Romanian expatriate sportspeople in Hungary
Expatriate footballers in Hungary
Romanian expatriate sportspeople in Vietnam
Expatriate footballers in Vietnam
FC Unirea Dej players